Asterix & Obelix: Mission Cleopatra is a 2002 French/Italian fantasy comedy film written and directed by Alain Chabat and adapted from the comic book series Asterix by René Goscinny and Albert Uderzo. Based on the book Asterix and Cleopatra, which had previously been adapted into a 1968 animated film. A sequel to Asterix and Obelix vs. Caesar (1999), it is the second installment in the Asterix film series.

Christian Clavier and Gérard Depardieu reprise their roles as Asterix and Obelix, alongside newcomers Jamel Debbouze, Monica Bellucci, Claude Rich, Gérard Darmon, Édouard Baer, Dieudonné, and Chabat himself.

It was the most expensive French movie at that time, before being beaten by A Very Long Engagement two years later. A critical success, it was also a major box office success in France, becoming its most successful film in 36 years and second biggest commercial success of all time after 1966's La Grande Vadrouille.

Plot 
Infuriated by belittlements, Queen Cleopatra makes a deal with Julius Caesar: if the Egyptians build a palace at Alexandria, in three months, which is larger than Caesar's palace in Rome he must acknowledge that Egypt was the greatest of nations. To perform this task, Cleopatra hires the architect Numerobis, on pain of death and much to the dismay of Pyradonis, Cleopatra's customary architect. He and his secretary Papyris discuss the druid Getafix (Panoramix in the original French), whose potion empowers its drinkers; and Numerobis goes in search of him.

Numerobis arrives in Gaul and persuades Getafix to embark with him to Alexandria. Once they arrive, they use the druid's magic potion to speed up the construction (with Cleopatra's permission), and Pyradonis realizes he must stop Numerobis from finishing the palace within the deadline by sabotage (such as getting Asterix, Obelix and Getafix lost in a pyramid, or framing them for Cleopatra's failed assassination). After failing multiple times, Pyradonis finally decides to inform Caesar about the potion's use and the potential victory of Cleopatra. Caesar knows the Gauls (having failed to capture their village multiple times) and decides to besiege the construction site until Asterix, Obelix and Getafix surrender. Numerobis, Papyris and the three Gallics defend the site and decide to inform Cleopatra of Caesar's actions. Meanwhile, Pyradonis and Numerobis, both after drinking the potion, fight in the site until Numerobis finally wins the duel. Cleopatra arrives on the battlefield and reprimands Caesar's lack of sportsmanship. The Romans are forced to stop the siege and assist in the continuation of the construction, which is finished on time. The palace is inaugurated and Caesar counterwillingly names Egypt the greatest Empire there ever was. Numerobis wins a large amount of gold, Getafix receives manuscripts from the Library of Alexandria, and all the protagonists partake in a banquet (including some of the movie's Roman antagonists).

Cast

Additional voices
Jean Benguigi (Crustaceous)
Michel Elias
Sophie Noël (Bloody Beard's Daughter)

Voice cast

Additional voices
Matt Adler
Stephen Apostolina (Hutchus, "Superpower" Soldier #2, Flying thru Intersection Soldier)
Kirk Baily
Steve Blum (Starskyus, "Superpower" Soldier #1)
Steve Bulen (Documentary Narrator, Catapult Commander, Slave Driver with Horn)
Steve Cassling
David Cowgill (Nazi Commandant, Old Hayseed)
Dan Edelstein (Roman on Horseback)
Elisa Gabrielli
Jason Harris Katz (Young Hayseed, Cat)
Tom Kenny ("My Bad" Soldier)
Steve Kramer
Lex Lang (Jailer, Gaul Forest Centurion)
Matthew Labyorteaux
Jonathan Nichols
Paul Pape
Philip Proctor (Peg Leg)
Stuart Robinson (Roman Drill Instructor, Crow's Nest Lookout, Sculptor)
Lia Sargent (Bloody Beard's Daughter)
Michael Sorich (Cleopatra's Portraitist, Bribed Boatman)
Barry Stigler (Crustaceous)

Music

Soundtrack
 "Mission Cleopatra" – Snoop Dogg and Jamel Debbouze
 "Asterix and Cleopatra" – Philippe Chany
 "I Got You (I Feel Good)" – James Brown
 "Yakety Sax" – Boots Randolph
 "The Imperial March (Darth Vader's Theme)" – John Williams
 "Ti amo" – Umberto Tozzi and Monica Bellucci
 "Chi mai"- Ennio Morricone
 "Walk Like an Egyptian" – Deep Forest feat. Beverly Jo Scott

Release

Theatrical
The film had the widest opening in France at the time, opening on 950 screens.

Home media
In the United Kingdom, it was watched by 570,000 viewers on television during the first half of 2005, making it the most-watched foreign-language film on UK television during that period.

References

External links 
 
 
 

2000s children's comedy films
2002 films
French adventure comedy films
Italian adventure comedy films
2000s adventure comedy films
Mission Cleopatra
Ancient Alexandria in art and culture
Films set in ancient Egypt
Films set in ancient Alexandria
Depictions of Cleopatra on film
Depictions of Julius Caesar on film
Films shot in the Czech Republic
French sequel films
Films produced by Claude Berri
French children's films
Italian children's films
Italian sequel films
Remakes of French films
Films directed by Alain Chabat
Films produced by Thomas Langmann
2002 comedy films
2000s French films